Elizabethtown College (informally E-town) is a private college in Elizabethtown, Pennsylvania.

History

Founding and early years
Founded in 1899, Elizabethtown College is one of many higher learning institutions founded in the 19th century by churches or church members interested in the educational advancement of their denominational membership. The college was founded by interested members of the Church of the Brethren in response to an initiative by the Reverend Jacob G. Francis. Francis advocated for Elizabethtown because of the proximity to the railways. First classes for the new college were held on November 13, 1900, in the Heisey Building in downtown Elizabethtown. During its first two decades, the college operated as an academy, offering a limited curriculum centering on four-year teaching degrees and high school type classes.

1920–1950
In 1921, the Pennsylvania Department of Public Instruction accredited the College, and authorized its first baccalaureate degrees in arts and sciences. Later, in 1928, the college was approved by the Pennsylvania Supreme Court for pre-law education. In 1948, Elizabethtown College became accredited by the Middle States Association and in 1949 it joined the American Council of Education.

Presidents
The college's presidents were referred to as principals prior to 1902.

Isaac Newton Harvey "I.N.H." Beahm, 1900–1901 & 1904–1909
George Ness Falkenstein, 1901–1902
Daniel Conrad Reber, 1902–1904 & 1909–1918
Henry Kulp Ober, 1918–1921 & 1924–1928
Jacob Gibble Meyer, 1921–1924
Ralph Weist Schlosser, 1928–1929 & 1930–1941
Harry Hess Nye, 1929–1930
Charles Abba "A.C." Baugher, 1941–1961
Roy Edwin McAuley, 1961–1966
Morley Josiah Mays, 1966–1977
Mark Chester Ebersole, 1977–1985
Gerhard Ernest Spiegler, 1985–1996
Theodore E. Long, 1996–2011
Carl Strikwerda, 2011–2019
Cecilia McCormick, 2019–2021
Elizabeth “Betty” Rider, 2022–Present

Service to Others
Elizabethtown's motto is "Educate for Service." Over 600 students, alumni, faculty and administrators participate annually in the Into the Streets service program every October in the Elizabethtown community.

Academics
The College maintains 19 academic departments, offering 53 majors and 90+ minors and concentrations, with a core curriculum emphasizing the arts, humanities and sciences.

Continuing education

Over 50 years, the college's adult program evolved into what is known today as the School of Continuing and Professional Studies (SCPS). The school offers accelerated, undergraduate degree programs. Graduate programs include Master of Business Administration, Curriculum and Instruction, and Master of Music Education.

Honors program

Established in 1999, the Elizabethtown College Honors Program is a member of the National Collegiate Honors Council. The Honors Program was founded with an endowment gift from The Hershey Company and is supported in part through this endowment.

The program has continued to grow and maintains an enrollment of approximately 10 percent of the student body. 
In the spring of 2005, the Hershey Foods Company changed its name and subsequently, the program was renamed to the Elizabethtown College Honors Program, sponsored by The Hershey Company.

Student life
The Office of Student Activities (OSA) serves as a co-curricular educator and facilitator in creating environments that call for participation and involvement in the campus community.  Through the programming of student traditions, such as T.G.I.S. and Student Involvement Fairs, students are engaged in social experiences.

Elizabethtown offers student-run media that include a newspaper—The Etownian; a literary magazine—Fine Print; a television station—ECTV-40; a radio station—WWEC 88.3 FM; and a yearbook—the Conestogan. As a student newspaper for small schools, the Etownian was ranked First Place with Special Merit recognition from the American Scholastic Press Association in 2010.

Elizabethtown is affiliated with the Brethren Colleges Abroad (BCA) program which allows students to study abroad for an academic semester. In addition to BCA, the college offers multiple internship and study abroad opportunities through other affiliates.

Athletics
Elizabethtown College is a member of NCAA Division III, and the Landmark Conference. Although Elizabethtown College was founded in 1899, it was not until 1928 that the first officially sanctioned intercollegiate athletic contest was held. In April 2013, the College accepted the invitation to join the Landmark Conference effective July 1, 2014.

Men's Teams
 Baseball started in 1930
 Basketball started in 1928
NCAA Division III runner-up 2001-2002
 Cross Country started in 1956
 Golf started play in 1965. No seasons were held from 1978-1988, but it was reinstated in 1988.
 Lacrosse started in 2002
 Soccer started in 1938
NAIA co-champion 1959
NAIA runner-up 1960
NCAA Division III champions 1989
Swimming started in 1964
Tennis started in 1948
Track and Field started in 1929
Wrestling started in 1954
Hosted 2015 NCAA Division III Championship

Women's Teams
 Basketball started play in 1928.
NCAA Division III National Runner-Up: 1982-83, 1983-84
NCAA Division III National Champion: 1981-82, 1988-89
First Division III women's basketball team to 1,000 wins
Cross country started in 1956.
Field hockey started play in 1952.
Hosted 1984 NCAA Division III Field Hockey Championship
Fourth place finish in 1981
Lacrosse started play in 2002.
Soccer started play in 1988.
Hosted 1997 NCAA Division III Championship
Softball started play in 1979.
Swimming
Track and field was established in 1929, but disappeared quickly. It was reestablished in 1975, but the women's team ended because of a lack of participation in 1981. The team was brought back in 1998, but the College did not begin competing again until 2000.
Volleyball started in 1978

Former sports teams
Football was played for one season in 1928. It was not sanctioned by the College, but did play a full intercollegiate schedule.

Individual National Champions
Kevin Clark - Indoor Track - NCAA Division III - Pole Vault - 2007
Beckie Donecker - Tennis - NCAA Division III - Singles - 1982 and AIAW Doubles Champion - 1981
Jen Haifley - Tennis - AIAW - Doubles - 1981
Eric Mast - Wrestling - NCAA Division III - 118 pound weight - 1973-1974 and 1976-1977

Notable alumni

Richard L. Bond '69, Former Chief Executive Officer, Tyson Foods
Carl Bowman '79, Sociologist / Author / Educator, Bridgewater College, Bridgewater, Virginia
Nelson Chittum, MLB player
Nia Dinata, film director
Mark C. Ebersole '43, former President of Elizabethtown College
Bill Foster '54, former head coach Duke men's basketball, and 1978 Coach of the Year
Gene Garber '69, former all-time saves leader for the Atlanta Braves (currently third behind John Smoltz and Craig Kimbrel).
Vera Hackman '25, faculty member (1944-1973) and Dean of Women (1944 - 1968); namesake of the Vera Hackman Apartments.
Mark A. Heckler '77, President, Valparaiso University (2007–present), Dean, University of Colorado School of Arts 1996–2007.
Lois Herr, progressive activist
David Hickernell '83, State Representative, Pennsylvania House of Representatives (2003–present)
S. Dale High, Chairman, High Industries Inc.
Dennis Hollinger, President of Gordon-Conwell Theological Seminary
Daniel J. Jones '97, lead investigator for "The Committee Study of the Central Intelligence Agency's Detention and Interrogation Program," which is better known as "The Torture Report." Jones is portrayed by Adam Driver in the film The Report.
Cayla Kluver (attended 2011-2012), author 
Ernest W. Lefever '42, Foreign affairs expert and founder of the Ethics and Public Policy Center, Washington, D.C.
Mark S. McNaughton '85, Former State Representative, Pennsylvania House of Representatives (1997-2007)
Daniel C. Miller, Harrisburg city councilor
Jeffrey B. Miller, former Pennsylvania state police commissioner 
Kim Powers, Contestant, Survivor: Africa (finished in sixth place)
Skip Roderick '74, former professional soccer player.
Eric Schubert, genealogist
Bruce I. Smith '56, Former State Representative, Pennsylvania House of Representatives (1981-2007)
 David Starr (dropped out), original name Max Barsky professional wrestler
Jim Tennant, former MLB player.
Jim Testerman, labor leader
Mike Tobash, State Representative, Pennsylvania House of Representatives (2011–present).
Charles Walker, nonviolence trainer and civil rights and peace activist.
Dan Washburn '96, award-winning Shanghai-based writer and journalist.
Martina White '10, State Representative, Pennsylvania House of Representatives.

Notable faculty and staff 
Kimberly van Esveld Adams: Scholar of Victorian literature and author of Our Lady of Victorian Feminism: The Madonna in the Work of Anna Jameson, Margaret Fuller, and George Eliot.
David S. Brown: Professor of History, author of biographies including The Last American Aristocrat  (Scribner, 2020),  Paradise Lost: A Life of F. Scott Fitzgerald  (Harvard, 2017), and Richard Hofstadter: An Intellectual Biography  (Chicago, 2006).
Christina Bucher: Biblical scholar and former Elizabethtown College Dean of Faculty, 1975 graduate of Elizabethtown College.
David Cullen: Grammy award-winning guitarist
Oya Dursun-Özkanca: Expert on Turkish foreign policy and the European Union.
Paul Gottfried: Political writer
Mark Harman: Kafka scholar and translator
Yvonne Kauffman: Award-winning coach for the college's women's tennis, basketball, and field hockey teams in the 1980s.
Donald Kraybill: Scholar of Amish studies
Jeffery D. Long: Professor of Religious Studies, Hindu expert and author of A Vision for Hinduism: Beyond Hindu Nationalism and Explorations in Indic Traditions.
Michael G. Long: Author of First Class Citizenship: The Civil Rights Letters of Jackie Robinson
W. Wesley McDonald: Author of Russell Kirk and the Age of Ideology.
Elizabeth Myer: One of the original faculty members of the college and the first female professor, namesake of Myer Residence Hall.
Susan Traverso: Former Provost of Elizabethtown College, current President of Thiel College

References

Further reading 
Williamson, Chet. United Work and Spirit: A Centennial History of Elizabethtown College. Elizabethtown College Press, 2001.

External links
 Official website

 
Liberal arts colleges in Pennsylvania
Universities and colleges affiliated with the Church of the Brethren
Educational institutions established in 1899
Sports in Lancaster, Pennsylvania
Universities and colleges in Lancaster County, Pennsylvania
1899 establishments in Pennsylvania
Private universities and colleges in Pennsylvania